The 2020 Cadillac Grand Prix of Sebring was a sports car race sanctioned by the International Motor Sports Association (IMSA). The race was held at Sebring International Raceway in Sebring, Florida on July 18, 2020. This race was the third round of the 2020 WeatherTech SportsCar Championship, and the second round of the 2020 WeatherTech Sprint Cup.

The race was won by the #31 team of Pipo Derani and Felipe Nasr, while the LMP2 class victory was taken by Patrick Kelly and Spencer Pigot, who were awarded the win after the #81 entry was disqualified for failing to meet drive time limits. The GTLM class was won by the #4 entry for Tommy Milner and Oliver Gavin, while Jack Hawksworth and Aaron Telitz secured their second consecutive class victory in GTD.

Background
The race was just the second for the WeatherTech SportsCar Championship after returning from the pandemic-induced hiatus. The race was added to the schedule in May due to said pandemic, becoming the second race of the season at Sebring alongside the rescheduled 12-hour race. Similarly to the previous round at Daytona, a limited number of fans were announced to be allowed into the track for the event. In late June, Cadillac was announced as the title sponsor of the event. The race marked the beginning of the LMP2 overall championship, as their only previous race (the 24 Hours of Daytona) counted for the Michelin Endurance Cup exclusively. Similarly, the GTD class only scored points towards the WeatherTech Sprint Cup in this race, not the overall GTD championship.

On July 10, 2020, IMSA released the latest technical bulletin regarding Balance of Performance for the race. However, no changes were made to any cars taking part in the event.

Entries

A total of 29 cars took part in the event, up from 26 cars in the previous round, thanks in part to the inclusion of the LMP2 class which was absent from the Daytona race. There were 8 cars in the DPi class, 8 cars in the LMP2 class, 6 cars in the GTLM class, and 10 cars in the GTD class. The DPi field was unchanged in terms of entries from the previous event, although Felipe Nasr returned after missing the previous race due to testing positive for COVID-19. Stephen Simpson also replaced Chris Miller in the #85. Patrick Kelly replaced Simon Trummer in the #52 due to travel restrictions, and Gustavo Menezes was announced to run in the #81, making his first IMSA start since 2018. The two Meyer Shank Racing Acuras were absent from the event due to the round only scoring points towards the WeatherTech Sprint Cup.

Qualifying

Qualifying results

Results

Notes

References

External links

Cadillac Grand Prix of Sebring
Cadillac Grand Prix of Sebring
Cadillac Grand Prix of Sebring